Heterotetracystis is a genus of green algae, specifically of the family Tetracystaceae.

References

External links

Chlorophyceae genera
Chlorophyceae